Wolfgang Dubin is a paralympic athlete from Austria competing mainly in category F36 shot and discus events.

Wolfgang has competed in the shot and discus in the 1996, 2000 and 2004 Summer Paralympics.  In the 1996 games he won a bronze medal in the shot put, this improved to gold in 2000 but in 2004 after winning the silver medal in the shot put he had it withdrawn because he didn't hold the necessary paperwork for the therapeutic use of a medicine that he was taking.

References

Paralympic athletes of Austria
Athletes (track and field) at the 1996 Summer Paralympics
Athletes (track and field) at the 2000 Summer Paralympics
Paralympic gold medalists for Austria
Paralympic bronze medalists for Austria
Living people
Medalists at the 1996 Summer Paralympics
Medalists at the 2000 Summer Paralympics
Year of birth missing (living people)
Paralympic medalists in athletics (track and field)
Austrian male shot putters